The following table presents a listing of Nigeria's 36 states and the Federal Capital Territory ranked by their literacy rate

List by UNESCO (2012) 
Literacy rate of the population over 6 according to data by the UNESCO.

References 

Ranked lists of country subdivisions
Literacy
literacy rate
Nigeria, literacy rate